Espina is a Spanish, Astur-Leonese and Catalan surname.  Notable people with the surname include:

Concha Espina (1869–1955), Spanish writer
Gerardo Espina, Jr (born 1970), Filipino politician
Gretchen Espina (born 1988), Filipino singer and actress
Marcelo Espina (born 1967), Argentine retired footballer
Darío Espina Pérez (1920–1996), Cuban exile
Gustavo Adolfo Espina Salguero (born c. 1946), 30th President of Guatemala

See also
Lina Espina-Moore (1919–2000), Cebuano writer
Fernando Martín Espina (1962–1989), Spanish basketball player, brother of Antonio Martín Espina
Antonio Martín Espina (born 1966), Spanish basketball player, brother of Fernando Martín Espina
La Espina, a parish in Salas, Asturias, Spain
Espinas, a commune in southern France
Espinas (surname)
Espina (band) Mexican heavy metal / hard rock band

Spanish-language surnames
Catalan-language surnames